Ralph J. Bunche III (born 1978) is an American human rights lawyer. He is the General Secretary of the Unrepresented Nations and Peoples Organization (UNPO), an international membership organization established to facilitate the voices of unrepresented and marginalised nations and peoples worldwide and dedicated to fighting colonialism in all its forms and promoting the right to self-determination for all. He was elected General Secretary of UNPO in September 2018.

Bunche in addition to his duties as General Secretary of the UNPO, has also manages UNPO's Dutch and US foundations. He is a lawyer who has worked with governments, businesses and civil society around the world on international law, criminal justice and human rights issues.  At one point during his time with the UNPO he was also Head of Cornwall Brussels Office (CBO) a para-diplomatic post representing the interests of Cornwall and the Cornish people in Brussels.

Education and family 
Bunche received his B.A. degree from Keele University in 2000, his M.A. from the University of Essex in 2002 and his J.D. from Columbia Law School in 2006. 

His grandfather was African-American political and social scientist Ralph Bunche who served the United Nations in various capacities and was awarded the Nobel Peace Prize in 1950 for his work as mediator in Palestine in 1948–1949.

References

21st-century American lawyers
Living people
21st-century American politicians
American people of African descent
1979 births
Alumni of Keele University
Alumni of the University of Essex
Columbia Law School alumni